Volmerange may refer to two communes in the Moselle department in north-eastern France:
 Volmerange-lès-Boulay
 Volmerange-les-Mines